MTV Pulse Italy was an Italian television channel and like MTV Hits broadcast chart hits non-stop with many music-related themed zones and much programming from MTV and MTV Italy. Broadcast only on SKY Italia channel 707 (but also available on Italian IPTV services).

On 10 January 2011 MTV Pulse Italy was closed down and its frequencies were taken over by the pan-European music channel MTV Dance.

Programming
30 minutes of
A Shot at Love with Tila Tequila
Clipshake
Coffee Break
College Rock
Dance Hour
Girls Rock!
Life of Ryan
Love Test
Milk & Clip
Mighty Moshin' Emo Rangers
My Super Sweet Sixteen
Pimp My Ride
Rock Hour
TRL Italy
TRL Top 10 Countdown
Urban Hour
Videorama

References

External links
 Official site 

MTV channels
Telecom Italia Media
Music organisations based in Italy
Television channels and stations established in 2007
Television channels and stations disestablished in 2011
2007 establishments in Italy
2011 disestablishments in Italy
Defunct television channels in Italy
Italian-language television stations